The Lyophyllaceae is a family of fungi in the order Agaricales. Lyophyllaceae was circumscribed by mycologist Walter Jülich in 1981.

Some species are popular as edible fungi, such as the brown beech mushroom Hypsizygus tessellatus and Lyophyllum shimeji.

Genera
The family currently includes the following genera:

Asterophora
Blastosporella
Calocybe
Calocybella
Gerhardtia
Hypsizygus
Lyophyllopsis
Lyophyllum
Myochromella
Ossicaulis
Rugosomyces
Sagaranella
Tephrocybe
Tephrocybella
Termitomyces
Termitosphaera

See also
List of Agaricales families

References

External links

 
Agaricales families
Taxa named by Walter Jülich
Fungi described in 1981